4th CFCA Awards

Best Film: 
 Silence of the Lambs 
The 4th Chicago Film Critics Association Awards were announced on March 5, 1992 during a ceremony at The Pump Room. They honored the finest achievements in 1991 filmmaking. The nominees were revealed in January 1992. Thelma & Louise and Barton Fink tied for the most nominations with six each. The Silence of the Lambs earned the most awards (5), including Best Film.

Winners and nominees
The winners and nominees for the 4th Chicago Film Critics Awards are as follows:

Best Actor
Anthony Hopkins – The Silence of the Lambs 
 Warren Beatty – Bugsy 
 Val Kilmer – The Doors
 Nick Nolte – The Prince of Tides
 John Turturro – Barton Fink

Best Actress
Jodie Foster – The Silence of the Lambs 
 Geena Davis – Thelma & Louise
 Laura Dern – Rambling Rose
 Anne Parillaud – La Femme Nikita
 Susan Sarandon – Thelma & Louise

Best Cinematography 
Roger Deakins – Barton Fink

Best Director 
Jonathan Demme – The Silence of the Lambs
 Joel Coen – Barton Fink
 Ridley Scott – Thelma & Louise

Best Film
The Silence of the Lambs
 Barton Fink
 Beauty and the Beast
 Boyz n the Hood
 Thelma & Louise

Best Foreign Film
An Angel at My Table

Best Screenplay 
Ted Tally – The Silence of the Lambs
 Joel and Ethan Coen – Barton Fink
 Callie Khouri – Thelma & Louise

Best Supporting Actor 
Harvey Keitel – Bugsy
 John Goodman – Barton Fink

Best Supporting Actress 
Mercedes Ruehl – The Fisher King

Most Promising Actor 
Ice Cube – Boyz n the Hood 
 Brad Pitt – Thelma & Louise

Most Promising Actress 
Juliette Lewis – Cape Fear

Commitment to Chicago 
Irv and Essie Kupcinet

References

http://www.chicagofilmcritics.org/index.php?option=com_content&view=article&id=49&Itemid=59

 1991
1991 film awards